Mysterio (Quentin Beck) is a supervillain appearing in American comic books published by Marvel Comics. Created by Stan Lee and Steve Ditko, the character first appeared in The Amazing Spider-Man #13 (June 1964). He is primarily depicted as an adversary of the superheroes Spider-Man and Daredevil. While Mysterio does not possess any superhuman abilities, he is a former special effects artist, illusionist and actor who uses his talents to commit crimes. He is a founding member of the supervillain team the Sinister Six.

The character has appeared in numerous media adaptations, including feature films, television series and video games. Jake Gyllenhaal portrayed Mysterio in the live-action Marvel Cinematic Universe film Spider-Man: Far From Home (2019), reappearing in archive footage in The Daily Bugle (2019, 2021) and Spider-Man: No Way Home (2021).

Publication history
Mysterio was created by Stan Lee and Steve Ditko and first appears in The Amazing Spider-Man #13 (June 1964). It was later retconned that the aliens seen in The Amazing Spider-Man #2 had been Mysterio and his men in disguise. It was revealed that he had been hired by the Tinkerer to disguise himself as an extraterrestrial and uncover military and industrial secrets. Like the Kingpin, he has crossed over and been a major villain of Daredevil. In the story arc "Guardian Devil", he crossed into Daredevil's territory, almost pushing Daredevil over the edge.

Fictional character biography

Background and first appearances
Quentin Beck is a special effects master and stunt man working for a major Hollywood studio with dreams of making a name for himself in the film industry. However, he came to see his career in special effects as a dead-end job. His attempts to become an actor were poorly received, but he realized that his expertise in illusions could make him an effective criminal. In his first battle with Spider-Man, after he frames Spider-Man for robbing the Midtown Museum, Mysterio obstructs the hero's spider-sense with gas and dissolves Spider-Man's webbing with a chemical abrasive. However Spider-Man tricks Mysterio into revealing he robbed the museum, then Spider-Man revealed he had captured it on tape. Mysterio was then jailed, blaming Spider-Man for his ruined career.

Mysterio later joins the Sinister Six in an attempt at revenge on Spider-Man. In an elaborate scheme, Doctor Octopus gives each member of the Sinister Six a card with the location of the next battle written on it. Each location was carefully selected to best suit that member's particular talents and Spider-Man will have to fight them one after the other. Only once Spider-Man has defeated each opponent, will he be able to obtain the card that will identify the next location. Doctor Octopus believed that with this plan, each of the Sinister Six would weaken Spider-Man a little bit more so that his chances would grow slimmer after each battle. When Spider-Man reaches Mysterio, his third opponent, he is immediately attacked by a group of highly developed robot replicas of the X-Men controlled by Mysterio. After successfully defeating the robots and Mysterio, Spider-Man gets the next card that enables him to go on to battle the Sandman.

Further appearances and decline

Mysterio later creates the alias of world-renowned psychiatrist Dr. Ludwig Rinehart, using technology and hypnosis in an attempt to make Spider-Man lose his mind, and nearly convincing him to unmask himself, though ironically Spider-Man was helped by J. Jonah Jameson suddenly bursting into the house. Spider-Man then unmasked Mysterio. Mysterio then establishes a brief partnership with the Wizard in a plot to kill Spider-Man and the Human Torch on a Hollywood movie set by pretending to enroll them in a film. However, they were both defeated and arrested.

While Beck is incarcerated, his cellmate Daniel Berkhart briefly becomes Mysterio on the original's behalf. Out of prison, Beck resumes his Ludwig Rinehart identity to manipulate Spider-Man's Aunt May into revealing the whereabouts of a lost fortune hidden in her house. Beck used bogus alien disguises to frighten May Parker into revealing the location of the fortune, but then learned that the money had long ago been eaten by silverfish. In his next appearance, Mysterio tricks Spider-Man into believing that he had caused the death of a bystander. Mysterio then attempts to scare the tenants from an apartment complex in a real estate scam thwarted by the preteen superhero team Power Pack, much to his later humiliation. He is recruited by Doctor Octopus to form the second Sinister Six, and battles Spider-Man. In other encounters, Mysterio has faked the death of Spider-Man's Aunt May, and made deals with demons from Limbo. Despite this, however, Mysterio was constantly beaten by Spider-Man and usually arrested. He joined Doctor Octopus' Sinister Six on several occasions, but this never gave him the edge against his foe that he desired. Eventually, he began to lose credibility as a supervillain, with his defeat at the hands of Power Pack being a particularly humiliating moment.

"Guardian Devil" and death
After his final imprisonment during the "Guardian Devil" story arc, Mysterio was given an early release, as he had been diagnosed with a brain tumor and lung cancer, both caused by the chemicals and radiation from his equipment. He was given one year to live, but this imminent death caused prison psychiatrists to grant him an early release. Obsessed with exacting his final revenge on Spider-Man, he was disappointed when he deduced from newspaper articles that the current Spider-Man was just a clone and saw no dignity in overpowering a "copy" of the real thing (even though by then, the clone had been killed and the current Spider-Man was indeed the original). Mysterio decided to change his plan and focus on Daredevil, whom he had encountered recently during an insurance scam that the hero had thwarted; Mysterio believed that he had found a 'kindred spirit' in Daredevil, in the sense that both were second stringers with little reputation outside their homes.

After the Kingpin gave Mysterio all the information he possessed about Daredevil's past, Mysterio developed an elaborate plot to drive Daredevil insane using a special designed drug to influence Daredevil's mood, presenting him with a baby girl and conflicting reports that she was the second coming of Christ or the Antichrist, with the drug rendering Daredevil violent if anyone suggested that the child was innocent. In the course of the scheme, Karen Page was killed by Bullseye after Mysterio had convinced her that she was suffering from HIV due to her time as a porn star, Matt Murdock's partner Foggy Nelson was framed for murder after cheating on his current lover, and Daredevil nearly lost his mind as he appeared to be tormented by the forces of Hell.

However, Daredevil's will proved stronger than Mysterio expected, and once Doctor Strange discovers and magically removed the drug from Daredevil's bloodstream, Daredevil unmasked Mysterio as the mastermind, shattering the villain's helmet in fury and revealing his now-languishing appearance. Beck had thought Daredevil would kill him upon discovery, which in his eyes, was a "grand way to end his final show". Daredevil denied him this and instead dismissed Mysterio's scheme as a basic 'B-movie' plot and calling Mysterio a 'human Xerox', incapable of having an original thought in his life; if nothing else, the Kingpin had already attempted to drive Daredevil insane and he had used the 'supernatural intruding on our world' idea in a previous attack on J. Jonah Jameson. Broken in every sense of the word, Mysterio, saying he was stealing an idea from Kraven the Hunter, pulled out a gun and shot himself dead. While Mysterio has faked his own death several times in the past, this act was apparently legitimate, as Mysterio literally had nothing left to live for.

Resurrection

Sometime later, Quentin Beck suddenly appears in the Midtown High School auditorium in a dark red version of his costume during the three-way battle between Spider-Man and the two successor Mysterios. He confronts Francis Klum before leaving him for Berkhart to deal with. Quentin Beck then confronts Miss Arrow, revealing that half his head is missing from the gunshot wound and explains that, having gone to Hell for suicide, his "superiors" in the afterlife sent him back to Earth to maintain a cosmic balance. His superiors want Spider-Man to continue working at the school and Beck knows Miss Arrow has a similar role for the "other side". Berkhart and Klum briefly battle one another before Spider-Man captures Berkhart. While trying to escape, Klum runs into Arrow and tries to take her as a hostage, only to be stabbed by one of her stingers. He then teleports away, badly bleeding. Neither Berkhart nor Klum have been seen since. Though Berkhart was incarcerated, Klum's status is uncertain. In The Amazing Spider-Man #581, a flashback shows that, prior to his suicide, Beck had been hired by Norman Osborn to fake his son Harry's death.

Mysterio reappears during The Gauntlet story line, which re-introduces several past Spider-Man villains with new twists. This Mysterio claims to be a returned Quentin Beck who had faked his death, though it's unclear how this fits in with his aforementioned appearance. He is under the employ of Maggia crime member Carmine, creating androids of various deceased Maggia (including their dead leader Silvermane) to give them a credibility boost in their gang war with Mister Negative. Beck controls the Silvermane robot himself and plants seeds of rebellion in Hammerhead, who had left the Maggia under the belief that Silvermane was deceased. He also tries to drive Spider-Man mad by making him think he's accidentally killed several gang members, while trying to convince him that a returned Captain George Stacy, who claims to have always been the gangster known as the Big Man, also faked his death years earlier. This turn makes Spider-Man realize that Mysterio must be behind the recent mysterious return of so many deceased individuals, and he vows to have Mysterio pay for making it personal. Shortly after, Mysterio uses the Silvermane robot to murder Carmine in an attempt to secretly seize control of the Maggia and its fortune. Spider-Man eventually exposes and confronts Mysterio, who flees. He later runs into the Chameleon, who tells him that he has some friends who are "dying" to meet him. The "friends" the Chameleon was talking about happens to be the Kravinoffs. He was present at the ritual where Spider-Man is seemingly sacrificed in order to revive Kraven the Hunter.

During the Origin of the Species story line, Mysterio is among the supervillains invited by Doctor Octopus to join his villains' team where he is promised that he will receive a reward. Mysterio went after Spider-Man for Menace's infant. He manages to trick Spider-Man into giving him the child by projecting an image of Avengers Mansion and uses his illusions to try to frighten Spider-Man. Ultimately, Spider-Man recovers the baby from Mysterio after figuring out the villain's involvement. Mysterio is next seen as part of the new Sinister Six organized by Doctor Octopus. He first works with Chameleon to distract Spider-Man and the Future Foundation, faking an attack in the Caribbean by zombie pirates while the rest of the Six steal something from the Fantastic Four's headquarters. He also participates in an attack by the Six on the Avengers Academy. When the Sinister Six launch an attack on the Intelligencia and their new doomsday weapon, Mysterio is responsible for taking down the Red Ghost and his Super-Apes.

Subsequent schemes
Doctor Octopus and Mysterio later coordinate the Octobots that have infiltrated the Apogee 1 Space Station. When Mysterio notices that some of the Octobots were disabled, Doctor Octopus orders the Octobots to finish their mission and then destroy the space station. Spider-Man, the Human Torch and John Jameson later discover that some of the space station's crew members have been taken over by the Octobots, making them Octobot-controlled zombies that obey Doctor Octopus's commands. While in their undersea base, Doctor Octopus and Mysterio discover that their Octobot-controlled zombies have passed out. After Apogee 1 Space Station is destroyed and the crew is evacuated by Spider-Man, the Human Torch and John Jameson, Doctor Octopus tells the rest of the Sinister Six that his master plan is about to begin.

Although Mysterio aids Doctor Octopus in his attack against the Avengers and his plan to "heal" the world during the "Ends of the Earth" story line, he agrees to help Spider-Man, Silver Sable and the Black Widow defeat Doctor Octopus's plans after Spider-Man convinces him that Doctor Octopus will not honor any deal he has made with the Six, as he will almost certainly scorch Earth if his plan succeeds. Mysterio leads Spider-Man and his allies to a Mayan temple where Doctor Octopus's base is located (claiming that he was responsible for the choice of location due to the supposed Mayan prophecies of the world ending in 2012), leaving them to face the mind-controlled Avengers. After disabling the Octobots that were controlling the Avengers, Mysterio lends Spider-Man and Silver Sable his vehicle and provides them with the location of Dr. Octopus' base. He then disappears in a cloud of smoke and leaves the heroes to deal with Octavius.

During the Spider-Men story line, Mysterio has crossed over to the Ultimate Marvel Universe multiple times only to encounter the mainstream Spider-Man after his last travel. In the struggle, Spider-Man is transported to the Ultimate Universe, where Mysterio reveals that his Ultimate counterpart is simply a robotic avatar controlled remotely. Refusing to allow Spider-Man to escape, Mysterio sends a robot avatar after Peter and the new Spider-Man. Despite using chemical weapons to create the hallucination that both Spider-Men are fighting an army of their greatest foes, Peter's greater experience allows him to focus through Mysterio's illusions and destroy the avatar. Mysterio subsequently departs, reflecting that it is more appropriate to leave Spider-Man trapped in a world where he is dead, leaving Iron Man to examine his discarded technology. Mysterio is preparing to cement his victory by destroying the portal and trapping Spider-Man in the Ultimate universe forever. But unable to resist the temptation to see how his enemy is faring, he keeps the portal open long enough for Peter and the Ultimates to capture him. Despite his best efforts to throw them off with their worst fears, Mysterio is quickly defeated. Fury decides to keep him prisoner in the Ultimate universe due to his knowledge of Peter's secret identity. He is later questioned by the Ultimates when Galactus is accidentally transferred into the Ultimate universe after they determine that Galactus originates from Mysterio's world. Beck reveals that Galactus's past assaults had been defeated by his world's Reed Richards, allowing the Ultimates to send their Reed to Earth-616 to hack his counterpart's files on Galactus.

Eight months after the events of Secret Wars, Mysterio attacks Parker Industries with the intention of using the company's Webware technology to cause mass hysteria by beaming imagery directly into the minds of the product's users. The plot is thwarted by Deadpool, who runs Mysterio over with his "Dead-Buggy". While recovering in the hospital, Beck is visited by an unknown figure, who leaves a Mysterio bust on the supervillain's bedside table while declaring that he is "not out of the game yet". After Deadpool is manipulated into killing Spider-Man, Mysterio tortures the hero's Limbo-bound soul by projecting his own spirit into the realm using power provided by a mysterious benefactor. Deadpool is able to enter Limbo and help Spider-Man overpower Mysterio, who is afterward shown to have disappeared from his hospital bed.

Retirement and return to villainy
After being beaten by the likes of Deadpool and other superheroes, Quentin Beck left the supervillain business and relocated to Las Vegas. His daughter Misty Beck shows up in order to persuade him to become Mysterio again. Dusk shows some awareness of this, as she warns the Scarlet Spider about Mysterio, but when Reilly visits the villain, he accepts Beck's explanation that he has decided to retire. Misty later involves her father in a ritual that would grant her great power if she sacrificed something she truly loved in exchange. But when she attempted to kill Beck, Reilly's intervention distracted her long enough for Beck to accidentally stab her resulting in him gaining the power himself as he places his left hand on the altar while shedding Misty's blood. Now possessing power drawn from Cyttorak, Beck recreates his Mysterio costume and attacks the Scarlet Spider. The Scarlet Spider defeats his foe by cutting off the hand that touched the altar, taking away Beck's power.

Mysterio later created the illusion of an alien invasion that lured every superhero team to fight them. Spider-Man discovered Mysterio's plot and defeated him. Mysterio stated that he wanted to become more than a lesser criminal as Spider-Man webbed him up for the police. When in court, Janice Lincoln appeared as Mysterio's lawyer as the vision of an unidentified entity with centipedes on him appeared in the courthouse, claiming to be the one who revived Mysterio.

In the pages of "Dead Man Logan," Miss Sinister coaxes Quentin Beck into becoming Mysterio again in exchange for keeping him safe from Old Man Logan. Miss Sinister informed him that his counterpart tricked Wolverine into killing the X-Men. In order to take over the world, Miss Sinister and Mysterio side with Neo-HYDRA. Mysterio would later find out that Miss Sinister and Neo-HYDRA would dispose of him once he has served his purpose. This led to Mysterio taking Old Man Logan to Neo-HYDRA's base. During the battle between Old Man Logan and Neo-HYDRA, Mysterio used an illusion to make Old Man Logan think that he killed him. Quentin then makes his way back to Bedford Hills Psychiatric Hospital while tossing out his Mysterio costume.

Dealings with Kindred
Mysterio is later shown attending a meeting with psychiatrist Dr. Winhorst, where he affirms his old story that he was sent to Hell after his suicide and was released by some demonic entity whose name he fears to say. Dr. Winhorst attempts to convince Beck that he actually faked his suicide and his belief in the demon is just his former illness causing him to hallucinate. But when the demon that brought Beck back to life appears in the psychiatrist's office, it affirms that the "demon" is real. When Dr. Winhorst flees, Mysterio begs forgiveness from the entity. Although initially prepared to spare Mysterio, the entity realizes that Peter is somehow witnessing these events in a dream. The entity adopts the temporary alias of Kindred and kills Beck again so that he cannot reveal his identity to Spider-Man before Kindred is ready. However, it is soon established that the "Mysterio" who died was actually Dr. Winhorst, who was brainwashed by Mysterio to believe that he was the supervillain to give Mysterio a chance to escape from Bedford Hills Psychiatric Hospital. Although Kindred is angered that Mysterio shared his real name with Winhorst to increase the reality of the delusion, he notes that Mysterio keeps running from his purpose and gives him a script to stick to.

More recently, Mysterio had begun production on a film with Mary Jane Watson on a remote set he used to torment Spider-Man, to make a play for a girl he wronged while under the alias of Cage McKnight. After being discovered by Mary Jane, they cooperated in the project, but the filming was turned tumultuous by the Savage Six when the Vulture felt insulted by the "unauthorized use" of his person in the film's plot. Nevertheless, thanks to an authentic recording of their attack, the movie became a rousing success.

Sinister War
In a prelude to the "Sinister War" story line, Mysterio is still in Kindred's servitude as he places Mysterio in Doctor Octopus' latest incarnation of the Sinister Six. Peter and Mary Jane Watson are attending the premiere of MJ's new movie which she worked on with Mysterio under the alias of Cage McKnight. Peter is planning to propose to Mary Jane when the movie is over in front of the press and public, but the Savage Six take the opportunity to attack. Mysterio comes to Mary Jane's rescue, exposing his identity to Peter and the Savage Six. Doctor Octopus then attacks the theater with Electro, Kraven the Hunter, the Lizard, and the Sandman as Doctor Octopus states to the Vulture that they need Mysterio. Mary Jane confesses to a concerned Peter that she knew who Mysterio was all along and vouches for him. Mysterio tries to tell Peter that he and Mary Jane's deal with Mephisto is to blame for everything that is presently happening, but Peter is far too distracted by the warring factions. Doctor Octopus offers Mysterio the opportunity to join the Sinister Six as long as he helps them capture Mary Jane. Mysterio complies and teleports away taking MJ with him while promising her that the "devil will get his due".

Mary Jane is transported to Mysterio's old studios where Beck reveals what happened to him after his suicide, transported to hell, and tortured there until Harry Osborn made him a deal. Taking it, Beck was revived around the time Peter's identity was public knowledge, his adventures in the Spider-Men crossover are referenced, and over time Harry stopped communicating with him until recently. Mysterio also reveals to Mary Jane that he was the therapist who helped her come to terms with Harry's death, but Mary Jane barely remembers this. Mary Jane pleas with Beck, reminding him he has changed, but Mysterio remains loyal to the deal he struck and tells Mary Jane that he knows what fate awaits him. Mysterio rejoins the teams of villains while leaving Mary Jane to the mercy of Kindred. It is later revealed that Mysterio used his time as Mary Jane's therapist to implant false memories of Gwen Stacy confessing to a brief affair with Norman Osborn, thus justifying the existence of Gwen's adult children, Gabriel and Sarah (actually clones created by Harry).

Powers and abilities
Quentin Beck does not possess superhuman abilities. He is an expert designer of special effects devices and stage illusions, a master hypnotist and magician and an amateur chemist and roboticist. He has extensive knowledge of hand-to-hand combat techniques learned as a stuntman, allowing him to engage in combat with Spider-Man despite his foe's superior physical abilities and using his skills at misdirection as a further method of self-defense.

Equipment
Mysterio's suit includes many devices to aid him. His helmet is made of one-way plexiglass, meaning he can see out but no one can see in. The helmet also includes an air supply to protect him from his own gases, sonar to navigate within his mist cloak and a holographic projector to create 3D illusions. His boots contain magnetic coil springs which allow him impressive leaps as well as the ability to cling to surfaces. Mysterio's costume contains nozzles in the boots and wrists that can release a constant stream of smoke that shields his movements. He can mix other chemicals into this smokescreen for various effects, including a gas that dulls and inhibits Spider-Man's spider-sense, a gas that causes paralysis for 30 minutes, an abrasive that eats away Spider-Man's webbing, hypnogens that make those around him more susceptible to his will and hallucinogens to cause vivid hallucinations. A combination of the hypnogens and hallucinogens, along with his holographic projectors, are how Mysterio achieves most of his illusions. The costume sometimes also includes offensive weaponry, such as lasers or knockout gas nozzles in the eye emblems on his shoulders, or electric coils within his cape to electrocute those who touch it.

Reception

Accolades 

 In 2009, IGN ranked Mysterio 85th in their "Top 100 Comic Book Villains.
 In 2014, IGN ranked Mysterio 13th in their "Top 25 Spider-Man Villains" list.
 In 2019, CBR.com ranked Mysterio 16th in their "25 Deadliest Spider-Man Villains" list.
 In 2021, Screen Rant included Mysterio in their "10 Best Spider-Man Comic Villains" list.
 In 2022, The A.V. Club ranked Mysterio 15th in their "28 best Marvel villains" list.
 In 2022, Newsarama ranked Mysterio 9th in their "Best Daredevil villains of all time" list.
 In 2022, Screen Rant included Mysterio in their "Marvel: The 10 Most Dangerous Villains Without Superpowers" list  and in their "15 Most Powerful Daredevil Villains" list.

Other characters named Mysterio

After Quentin Beck, there have been several other characters who became his successors after taking his mantle as Mysterio. The second Mysterio (Daniel Berkhart) was created by Gerry Conway and Ross Andru and first appeared in The Amazing Spider-Man #141 (February 1975). The third Mysterio (Francis Klum) was created by Kevin Smith and Terry Dodson, and he first appeared in Spider-Man/Black Cat: The Evil That Men Do #1 (August 2002), and became Mysterio in the final issue of the miniseries. The fourth Mysterio (an unknown man named "Mysterion") was created by Christopher Yost and David Lopez and first appeared in Avenging Spider-Man #22 (June 2013).

Daniel Berkhart
After the original Mysterio seemingly dies in prison during an escape attempt, J. Jonah Jameson hires Daniel Berkhart, a stuntman who had previously worked with Beck and Beck's cellmate, to torment Spider-Man while claiming to be Mysterio's ghost. After he is defeated by Spider-Man, Berkhart explains that Beck had bequeathed some of his equipment to him after his "death", and he felt he owed it to Beck to get revenge. The story leaves it ambiguous whether there is any truth to Berkhart's story or if he was simply covering up Jameson's role in the affair. Berkhart is arrested, despite there being no witnesses to his harassing Spider-Man. He tries to force Jameson to get a lawyer for him by threatening to reveal his involvement to the police, a plot thread which is never resolved.

Later, after Beck's suicide, someone claiming to be Mysterio appears with the revised Sinister Six, making references to his "death", stating how after fighting Daredevil he had exited in a "most spectacular fashion". There was some confusion to this Mysterio's identity until the miniseries Spider-Man: The Mysterio Manifesto hinted that it was again Daniel Berkhart. This issue was not addressed again until a Mysterio briefly fought Spider-Man and was captured. Berkhart was later confirmed to be this second Mysterio by Quentin Beck. This Mysterio appeared during stories published between the original's death and subsequent return.

The Jack O'Lantern fought by Agent Venom claims to have killed off all of the surviving previous Jack O'Lanterns, leaving Berkhart's status uncertain.

Francis Klum
Francis Klum, a mutant with the ability to teleport, was sexually abused by his older brother Garrison (Mr. Brownstone) and forced to use his powers to assist Garrison's illegal activity as a heroin dealer. When Garrison dosed the Black Cat with heroin and attempted to rape her, Francis decided to stop his brother's cruelty for good, teleporting within and blowing up Garrison's body.

Eventually learning the details of Francis' abusive relationship with Garrison and his role in his brother's death, Felicia nearly convinced Francis to turn himself into the authorities; but Spider-Man, believing that Francis was trying to throw  Black Cat from the bridge on which they were talking, brutally attacked Klum. Believing that Felicia set him up, he fell from the bridge, teleported in mid-fall and sustained severe physical injuries, losing his left leg below the knee.

Hungry for revenge against Spider-Man, he contacted the Kingpin and purchased the paraphernalia of the currently-deceased Mysterio (Quentin Beck). He reasoned that by using an old enemy's costume, he could put Spider-Man off-guard; Spider-Man would assume he knew who he was dealing with until Klum demonstrated his powers and it was too late for the wall-crawler to do anything about it.

However, Klum's plans to kill Spider-Man at Midtown High were interrupted when he was stabbed in the chest by school nurse Miss Arrow's stingers after an altercation with the other two Mysterios (Quentin Beck having returned from the dead). Klum teleported to safety, although Arrow (who was later revealed to be Ero, a being composed of hundreds of spiders) would later state that her stingers were fatal to anyone except Spider-Man.

Klum later died from his wounds, but was resurrected as a clone by Miles Warren alongside other deceased Spider-Man villains. This clone of Klum in turn died soon after.

Mysterion
An unknown African American individual purchases the suit of Mysterio from Roderick Kingsley and calls himself Mysterion. He fights the Superior Spider-Man (Doctor Octopus's mind in Spider-Man's body) and the Punisher. While keeping the Punisher from killing Mysterion, the Superior Spider-Man captures Mysterion and places him in containment with the Sandman, Electro and the Chameleon in his hidden underwater lab. He is later forcibly put under mind control by the Superior Spider-Man and forced to join his Superior Six superhero team. Mysterion escapes with the other members after being freed from the Superior Spider-Man's influence.

Mysterion later attacks Liberty Island with an army of robot dinosaurs, which are defeated by Squirrel Girl and other superheroes.

Other versions

Amazing Spider-Man: Renew Your Vows
During the "Secret Wars" storyline in the pages of Amazing Spider-Man: Renew Your Vows, Mysterio appears as a member of Regent's Sinister Six where they are tasked to hunt down Spider-Man.

Marvel 1602
In Marvel 1602, this dimension's Mysterio, known as Magus, is a member of the Sinister Sextet, the dimension's Sinister Six. The Web Warriors (alternate versions of Spider-Man) visited the 1602 Universe to deal with the Sinister Sextet and apprehended the villain.

Marvel Noir
In the Marvel Noir universe, Mysterio is a stage magician who operated under the title of "The Magnificent Mysterio". He debuted during the Spider-Verse storyline where he and his assistant Ella collaborated with Wilson Fisk to obtain the blood of The Spider-Man after interrogating The Ox.

Marvel Zombies
In Marvel Zombies, a Zombie Mysterio appears with five other Spider-Man villains attempting to eat civilians, but all six are repelled by Magneto and Wolverine. It is revealed that he was somehow infected by the Zombie Spider-Man of this reality.

Marvel Zombies Return
A past version of Mysterio from Spider-Man's college days appears in Marvel Zombies Return, as a member of the Sinister Six and battles the reality hopping Zombie Spider-Man. Like his fellow Sinister Six members, he was horrified by the undead Spider-Man's actions. The Zombie Spider-Man pulls parts of this Mysterio's brain out of his dome and head, which infects Mysterio with the zombie virus, causing him to participate with other zombie members in eating Spider-Man's friends. Angered, the Zombie Spider-Man kills him.

Old Man Logan
In an alternate future of the Marvel Universe, Mysterio casts an illusion which makes Wolverine believe that the X-Men are various deadly villains of the Marvel Universe while matching their scents. Wolverine slaughters them all, only discovering the trick after he killed the last "villain" (Jubilee, who appeared as Bullseye) and the illusion cleared up. Without the X-Men, the Red Skull's alliance of villains manages to conquer America and kill most of the heroes.

Spider-Man Reign
In the Spider-Man: Reign alternate reality, an older Mysterio works with the 'Sinner Six' to stop Spider-Man's rebellious assault. Mysterio's fear-inducing powers fail to work, for Spider-Man had already confronted and become bored by his personal demons.

Spider-Verse
 In Edge of Spider-Verse, part of the Spider-Verse storyline, Mysterio is piloting an enormous flying orb and is infecting the people of New York with hallucinogenic gas. He came in conflict with SP//dr (Peni Parker) and despite being able to dose her with the gas, he was still beaten, brought in for interrogation and exposed an illegal biological enhancement ring.
 Another version of Mysterio is a member of the Six Men of Sinestry of the dimension Earth-803 and appears briefly assisting the group in escaping from Lady Spider.

Ultimate Marvel
The Ultimate Marvel version of Mysterio was introduced in Ultimate Spider-Man Annual #3. His appearance is drastically changed from his 616 counterpart. He wears all black with a green neck brace that produces blue smoke that envelopes his face. In his first appearance, he had a police technician  set up surveillance equipment to the police department. However, after NYPD's police captain Frank Quaid asked Spider-Man to aid them to find the crook who was somehow able to stay ahead of his unit. Mary Jane Watson, Spider-Man's love interest, figured out how the criminal does it after the hero informed her of the situation. After the police arrested his accomplice, the villain vowed to get even with Spider-Man and then escapes.

Mysterio appears again in Ultimate Comics Spider-Man #1, blasting Kingpin out the window of a skyscraper following the "Ultimatum". He publicly confesses to Wilson Fisk's murder and threatens the city, stating that he is now in charge. He releases a fear hallucinogen across Manhattan in order to rob the Federal Bank. Spider-Man stops him and Mysterio's personal hatred for the web slinger increases. Creating an illusion of the Hulk to lure Spider-Man to him, Mysterio ambushes and severely wounds the hero. Before Mysterio can unmask and kill Spider-Man, a mysterious vigilante rescues him and together they defeat Mysterio, revealing his true face. Mysterio finds Spidey's blood on his broken armor and designs a Spider-Slayer that personally targets Peter. Spider-Man defeats it. Before Mysterio can do anything else, the police rush to his hideout which they found by tracking a piece of Mysterio's tech. Mysterio curses and proceeds to blow up his hideout.

It was revealed in Spider-Men that this reality's Mysterio is a simple android, remotely controlled in real time by an "avatar" program that was created and sent forth by the Earth-616 Mysterio in order to conquer the Earth of the Ultimate Marvel universe.

Spider-Gwen
On Earth-65, Quentin Beck used to run a theme park named "The Cursed Carnival of Mysterio" in the state of New Jersey, where he created illusions based upon people's fears; however, due to the rise of modern technology and media, people became less scared of his park, the attendance dropped, and Mysterio went bankrupt. When the park fell into disrepair, Mysterio continued to reside in it, using his illusions to scare the outsiders away from the area.

In other media

Television
 Quentin Beck / Mysterio appears in the 1960s Spider-Man series, voiced by Chris Wiggins.
 Quentin Beck / Mysterio appears in the 1981 Spider-Man episode "The Pied Piper of New York Town", voiced by Michael Rye.
 Quentin Beck / Mysterio appears in the Spider-Man and His Amazing Friends episode "Spidey Goes Hollywood", voiced by Peter Cullen.
 Quentin Beck / Mysterio appears in Spider-Man: The Animated Series, voiced by Gregg Berger. This version was a former stuntman and special effects artist who blames Spider-Man for ruining his reputation. In his introductory episode, "The Menace of Mysterio", Mysterio frames Spider-Man for various crimes, though he is foiled and sent to jail. The former later becomes a member of the Kingpin's Insidious Six in the episodes "The Insidious Six" and "Battle of the Insidious Six". In his final appearance, "The Haunting of Mary Jane Watson", Mysterio breaks out of prison to aid Spider-Man in his search for Mary Jane Watson inside a studio Mysterio built to kill the web-slinger sometime ago. Along the way, they encounter Mysterio's lover Miranda Wilson, an actress who had been mortally wounded during Mysterio's first fight with Spider-Man and saved by the former's technology. She had kidnapped Watson to switch bodies with her, but Mysterio reveals his machinery is incapable of doing so. Devastated, Wilson sets the studio to self-destruct. Though Spider-Man and Watson make it out, Mysterio stays behind to be with Wilson, and they are both killed in the explosion.
 Quentin Beck / Mysterio appears in The Spectacular Spider-Man, voiced by Xander Berkeley. Introduced in the episode "Persona", this version was a film special effects expert and stuntman who became one of the Chameleon's henchmen alongside Phineas Mason. The Chameleon uses Beck's special effects and Mason's technology to impersonate Spider-Man in a series of crimes, but Beck and Mason are caught by the real Spider-Man and the Black Cat. In "Blueprints", Beck becomes Mysterio and passes himself off as a sorcerer who intends to save mankind from technology. Though the web-slinger defeats him after discovering his lair and technology, Beck creates a robot in his likeness to take his place in jail so he can continue serving the enigmatic crime boss, the Master Planner. Beck returns in the episode "Reinforcements" as part of the new Sinister Six. Despite using more robotic duplicates, Spider-Man captures Beck and ensures he is actually sent to jail. In "Opening Night", another robotic duplicate of Beck was remanded to the Vault and aided the other imprisoned villains in an attempt to kill Spider-Man while he was there to test the prison's security system, only for the Molten Man to accidentally destroy him.
 Quentin Beck / Mysterio appears in the Ultimate Spider-Man episode "The Moon Knight Before Christmas", voiced by Paul Scheer. This version was an old enemy of Spider-Man and a former stage magician who was presumed dead after he fell off the Brooklyn Bridge sometime prior to the series, though his body was never found. Following the incident, Spider-Man gave his helmet to Doctor Strange for safekeeping. However, Beck's daughter Frances Beck (voiced by Mary Kate Wiles), emerges in the present to steal Quentin's helmet and use it in an attempt to exact revenge on Spider-Man as the new Mysterio, only to run afoul of Moon Knight and discover that her father's soul was trapped within the helmet after he made a deal with Dormammu. After Spider-Man and Moon Knight enter the helmet and discover what happened to Quentin, they free the Becks from the helmet and spend Christmas Eve together.
 Quentin Beck / Mysterio appears in the 2017 Spider-Man series episode "Bring on the Bad Guys" Pt. 2, voiced by Crispin Freeman. This version was originally a stage magician but was fired, so took the identity of Mysterio to the crime world. He was quickly hired by Doctor Octopus, who, after losing his body to the Lady Octopus was taking refuge within the Living Brain robot. He used different illusions to trap Spider Man, but ultimately failed in his mission.

Film
Storyboard artist Jeffrey Henderson, who worked on the cancelled Spider-Man 4, stated in 2016 that Bruce Campbell (who had made cameo appearances throughout Sam Raimi's Spider-Man film series) was planned to appear as Mysterio in the film's opening montage of Spider-Man defeating several C- and D-list villains. In a 2022 interview, Raimi confirmed that cameo "was one of the possibilities" for the movie.

Marvel Cinematic Universe
Quentin Beck / Mysterio appears in media set in the Marvel Cinematic Universe (MCU), portrayed by Jake Gyllenhaal. 
 Introduced in the film Spider-Man: Far From Home (2019), this version is a former Stark Industries scientist who developed holographic technology that Tony Stark showcased in the film Captain America: Civil War (2016) and dubbed B.A.R.F. (Binary Augmented Retro-Framing). Angered at Stark for "stealing" his invention, the scientist was fired for his unstable nature. As a result, he swore revenge and joined forces with other like-minded ex-Stark Industries employees to take advantage of the power vacuum left in the wake of Stark's death in the film Avengers: Endgame (2019). To this end, they manufactured the Elementals using drones equipped with holographic technology, gave the scientist the alias of "Quentin Beck", and fabricated a backstory for the illusions by claiming the entities and Beck himself were from another universe. To build up his reputation and legitimize himself as an "Avengers-level" hero, Beck joins forces with an unknowing Talos disguised as Nick Fury and Spider-Man—whose classmates gave Beck the "Mysterio" moniker—to "defeat" the Elementals around the world while bonding with the latter to gain his trust and acquire a device Talos gave him on Stark's behalf. Once Spider-Man hands said device, E.D.I.T.H., over to him, Beck sets about fulfilling his master plan. However, when he learns Spider-Man broke off a holographic projector from one of the drones, he reluctantly decides to kill him along with anyone who could potentially reveal his secret. Using a fight in London between his holographic persona and an Elemental Fusion monster as a distraction, Beck attempts to act on this plan, but is foiled when Spider-Man destroys his drones and retrieves E.D.I.T.H. from him. During the fight, Beck is accidentally shot and killed by one of the drones. Unbeknownst to Spider-Man however, one of his associates downloaded the drones' data and doctored the footage to demonize Spider-Man, reveal his identity, and posthumously make Beck look like a hero before sending said footage to J. Jonah Jameson to show the world.
 Beck reappears in the film Spider-Man: No Way Home (2021), with Gyllenhaal briefly reprising his role via archive footage. Though charges against Spider-Man for Beck's death are dropped thanks to his lawyer Matt Murdock, the former and his friends struggle with negative publicity from the press, Jameson and people who believe Beck was a hero, leading to them getting rejected from MIT resulting in Spider-Man seeking Stephen Strange's help to make the world forget his identity.
 The full footage of Beck exposing Spider-Man's secret identity reappears in the web series The Daily Bugle, with Gyllenhaal reprising his role via archive footage once more.

Video games
 Quentin Beck / Mysterio appears in the Spider-Man Questprobe game; The Amazing Spider-Man and its sequel The Amazing Spider-Man 2; the Sega CD version of Spider-Man vs. The Kingpin; Spider-Man: Mysterio's Menace; The Amazing Spider-Man; Spider-Man: Return of the Sinister Six; both the Super NES and Sega Genesis games based on the 1990s animated series; The Amazing Spider-Man: Lethal Foes; and Spider-Man 2: The Sinister Six.
 Quentin Beck / Mysterio appears in the 2000 Spider-Man video game, voiced by Daran Norris.
 Quentin Beck / Mysterio appears as a boss in the Spider-Man 2 film tie-in game, voiced by James Arnold Taylor.
 In the home consoles version, Beck first appears as a former special effects artist who seeks to prove that Spider-Man is a fraud by challenging him to a series of "games", which he ultimately loses. Humiliated and in trouble with the police because his games allowed several criminals to escape, Beck assumes the identity of Mysterio, an alien who has come to conquer New York City with his army of robots. However, Spider-Man foils his schemes and reveals his charade. Later, while trying to rob a convenience store, Mysterio is easily defeated by Spider-Man and unmasked, leading to his arrest.
 In the PC version, Mysterio is hired by Doctor Octopus to distract Spider-Man by creating a massive illusion of a floating New York. Although he is eventually defeated by the web-slinger, he avoids capture via an illusion of himself.
 In the PSP version, after being accidentally broken out of prison by the Rhino, Mysterio takes hostages, but is eventually defeated by Spider-Man and arrested.
 Quentin Beck / Mysterio appears as a mini-boss in Marvel: Ultimate Alliance, voiced again by James Arnold Taylor. This version is a member of Doctor Doom's Masters of Evil.
 Quentin Beck / Mysterio appears as the final boss of Spider-Man: Friend or Foe, voiced by Robin Atkin Downes. He combines shards from the meteor that originally brought the Venom symbiote to Earth with his nanotechnology and hard-light holograms to create an army of Perpetual Holographic Avatar Nano-Tech Offensive Monsters (P.H.A.N.T.O.M.s). To ensure he has enough shards to strengthen his P.H.A.N.T.O.M.s and eventually take over the world, he also kidnaps and brainwashes other supervillains, whom he sends across the globe to retrieve more shards. After Spider-Man frees the villains from his control, they join forces with him to defeat Mysterio and his P.H.A.N.T.O.M.s.
 Quentin Beck / Mysterio appears as an assist character in the PS2 and PSP versions of Spider-Man: Web of Shadows, voiced by Greg Baldwin.
 Quentin Beck / Mysterio appears as the final boss of Spider-Man: Shattered Dimensions, voiced by David Kaye. He attempts to steal an artifact called the Tablet of Order and Chaos and sell it on the black market, but Spider-Man arrives to stop him. After a brief battle between the two, the tablet is shattered into 17 fragments, most of which get sent to three alternate realities. After managing to escape with one, Mysterio discovers it grants him real magic powers. While seeking out the other fragments, he takes Madame Web hostage and forces Spider-Man and three of his alternate counterparts to find them. Once they do so, Mysterio absorbs the recreated tablet and becomes a god-like being before destroying reality so he can recreate it in his image. However, he inadvertently allows Madame Web to bring the four Spider-Men together and defeat him; de-powering him and restoring reality before the original Spider-Man takes Mysterio to prison.
 Quentin Beck / Mysterio appears in Marvel Super Hero Squad Online, voiced by Dave Boat.
 Quentin Beck / Mysterio appears as a playable character in Lego Marvel Super Heroes, voiced by David Sobolov.
 Quentin Beck / Mysterio appears the final boss of Disney Infinity 2.0, voiced again by David Kaye.
 Quentin Beck / Mysterio appears as a boss in Marvel: Avengers Alliance, voiced again by David Kaye.
 Multiple alternate reality versions of Mysterio appear as bosses in Spider-Man Unlimited, voiced by Fred Tatasciore. They appear as members of a multiversal Sinister Six.
 Quentin Beck / Mysterio makes a cameo appearance in the end credits of Disney Infinity 3.0, voiced again by David Kaye.
 Quentin Beck / Mysterio appears as a boss in Marvel: Avengers Alliance 2.
 Mysterio appears as a playable character in Marvel: Future Fight.
 Quentin Beck / Mysterio appears as a playable character in Lego Marvel Super Heroes 2.
 Quentin Beck / Mysterio appears in Marvel Strike Force as a member of the Sinister Six.
 Quentin Beck / Mysterio appears as a playable character in Marvel Puzzle Quest. This version's design takes inspiration from the Marvel Cinematic Universe (MCU) incarnation.
 Quentin Beck / Mysterio appears as a boss in Marvel Ultimate Alliance 3: The Black Order, voiced again by David Kaye. This version is a member of the Sinister Six.
 Quentin Beck / Mysterio appears in the digital collectible card game Marvel Snap.

Toys and collectibles
 Mysterio received two action figures produced by Toy Biz under their Spider-Man: The Animated Series and Spider-Man Classics lines. The Toy Biz Mysterio was also repainted for the first wave of Spider-Man figures by Hasbro.
 Mysterio has been reproduced as a mini-bust and as a 13-inch (330 mm) statue by Bowen Designs. He has likewise been crafted as a mini-bust by Art Asylum as part of their Rogues Gallery line. He also makes up 1/7th of the "Sinister Six" statue set from Diamond Select.
 Hasbro has made various action figures of Mysterio over the years, including a Spider-Man 2 game version of Mysterio for their Spider-Man 3 movie figures series. In 2018, a new Marvel Legends figure of the character was released, based on his comic book version. Two versions of this figure was released, one featuring a green translucent head and a variant featuring a white translucent head. In 2019, another Marvel Legends figure was released based on his appearance in Spider-Man: Far From Home.

References

External links
 Mysterio at Marvel.com
 Profile of Mysterio I at Spiderfan.org 
 Profile of Mysterio II at Spiderfan.org 
 
 
 

Action film villains
Articles about multiple fictional characters
Characters created by Christopher Yost
Characters created by Gerry Conway
Characters created by Kevin Smith
Characters created by Ross Andru
Characters created by Steve Ditko
Characters created by Stan Lee
Comics characters introduced in 1964
Comics characters introduced in 1975
Comics characters introduced in 1996
Comics characters introduced in 2002
Fictional actors
Fictional characters from Los Angeles County, California
Fictional characters from New York City
Fictional hypnotists and indoctrinators
Fictional illusionists
Fictional roboticists
Fictional stage magicians
Fictional stunt performers
Fictional suicides
Film supervillains
Marvel Comics characters who can teleport
Marvel Comics film characters
Marvel Comics male supervillains
Marvel Comics supervillains
Spider-Man characters
Villains in animated television series